The 2014 Ole Miss Rebels football team represented the University of Mississippi in the 2014 NCAA Division I FBS football season. The team was coached by Hugh Freeze, in his third season with Ole Miss. The Rebels played their home games at Vaught–Hemingway Stadium in Oxford, Mississippi, and competed in the Western Division of the Southeastern Conference (SEC). 

The Rebels won the first seven games of the season, their best start since the Johnny Vaught era.  By October, they had risen as high as third in the nation, the highest they had been ranked at that late date in over half a century.  However, the team ended their season losing four of their six last games, including a season-ending 42-3 loss to TCU in the Peach Bowl, their first major bowl appearance since the 1970 Sugar Bowl, and easily the biggest bowl game they had attended since Vaught's tenure.  They finished the season as only the sixth Ole Miss team to win nine or more games since Vaught retired in 1973.

On February 11, 2019 Ole Miss announced the vacation of all wins in the years 2010, 2011, 2012, and 2016. In 2013, all wins except the Music City Bowl were vacated. In 2014, all wins except the Presbyterian game were vacated.

Before the season

National award watch lists
 Outland - Laremy Tunsil
 Maxwell - Chad Kelly
 Unitas Golden Arm - Bo Wallace
 Manning - Bo Wallace
 O'Brien - Bo Wallace
 Lombardi - Robert Nkemdiche
 Nagurski - Robert Nkemdiche
 Outland - Robert Nkemdiche
 Camp - Cody Prewitt
 Bednarik - Cody Prewitt
 Thorpe - Cody Prewitt
 Biletnikoff - Laquon Treadwell
 Camp - Cody Prewitt
 Bednarik - Cody Prewitt
 Mackey - Evan Engram
 CLASS - Deterrian Shackelford

Preseason All-America
 S Cody Prewitt
 Sports Illustrated, Phil Steele, Lindy's (1st team)
 OL Laremy Tunsil
 Sporting News, USA Today (1st team)
 DL Robert Nkemdiche
 Athlon, USA Today (2nd team)
 WR Laquon Treadwell
 Athlon (3rd team)
 TE Evan Engram
 Sporting News (3rd team)

Preseason All-SEC
 S Cody Prewitt
 Media, Coaches, Athlon, USA Today, Phil Steele, Lindy's (1st team)
 OL Laremy Tunsil
 Media, Coaches, Athlon, USA Today, Lindy's (1st team)
 DL Robert Nkemdiche
 Media, Coaches, Athlon, Phil Steele (1st team)
 WR Laquon Treadwell
 Athlon, USA Today (1st team)
 QB Bo Wallace
 Coaches, Athlon, Phil Steele, Lindy's (2nd team)
 S Tony Conner
 Media, Coaches, Athlon, Phil Steele, Lindy's (2nd team)
 LB Serderius Bryant
 Phil Steele, Lindy's (2nd team)
 OL Aaron Moris
 Athlon (2nd team)
 LB Denzel Nkemdiche
 Media (2nd team)
 DL C.J. Johnson
 Lindy's (3rd team)
 TE Evan Engram
 Athlon (3rd team)

Returning starters

Offense

Defense

Special teams

Personnel

Coaching staff

Source:

Roster
Official team roster

Depth chart
Depth chart

Schedule
Ole Miss played their first two games out of state vs. Boise State and Vanderbilt. Both games were played at NFL stadiums. The Boise State game was considered a neutral site while the Vandy game was a home game for Vanderbilt. Due to conference realignment, Ole Miss played at Vanderbilt for the second consecutive year.

Schedule Source:

Rankings

Game summaries

Boise State

Vanderbilt

Louisiana–Lafayette

Memphis

No. 3 Alabama

No. 14 Texas A&M

Tennessee

No. 24 LSU

No. 3 Auburn

Presbyterian

Arkansas

No. 4 Mississippi State

No. 6 TCU

References

Ole Miss
Ole Miss Rebels football seasons
Ole Miss Rebels football